Alan Lydiat Durst  (1883–1970) was a British sculptor and wood carver and member of the London Group of artists. Three of Durst's work are held in the permanent collection of Tate Gallery.

Personal life

Alan Durst was born at the rectory in Alverstoke, Hampshire, England on 27 June 1883. He was the son of William Durst who was the Rector of Alverstoke.  He married Elizabeth Clare Amy Barlow on 11 December 1918.  Durst died on 22 December 1970 and his funeral took place on Tuesday 29 December 1970  at Golders Green Crematorium.

Education
He was educated at Marlborough College and in Switzerland.
In 1913 he enrolled at the London County Council (LCC) Central School of Arts and Crafts As part of his studies Durst visited Chartres in early 1914. He went in fact to study stained glass windows but in his private papers held at Tate Britain Archive he explained that he was so taken with the magnificence of the statuary of Chartres Cathedral that he determined to pursue sculpture as a career.  As Durst puts it, seeing the Chartres statues “opened a door for me”.

Military service 

Durst served in the Royal Marine Light Infantry, first joining as a second lieutenant in 1901. Details of this service are shown in record ADM/196/63 held at The National Archive. He was promoted to lieutenant on 1 July 1902, and served until 1913 when he was placed on the "Retired List" and began his studies at the School of Art.

He returned to the Royal Marines in July 1914 and served from 1914 to 1919. In his private papers held at Tate Britain Archive Durst writes that he would often while away the time in his cabin when at sea by executing small carvings in ivory and in one of his photograph albums he features a Tea caddie with delicately carved ivory panels and adds the note "carved while at sea on active service-1918"

He was also recalled during the 1939-1945 conflict and in April 1921 for emergency service necessitated by the Coal Strike.

Career
After leaving art school Durst became Curator of the George Frederic Watts Museum in Compton from 1919 to 1920. He left that museum to take up sculpture and wood carving on a full-time basis, and taught wood carving at the Royal College of Art from 1925 to 1940 and from 1945 to 1948. Durst had his first solo exhibition at the Leicester Galleries in London in 1930 and another in 1935. He was a regular exhibitor at the Royal Academy. We learn from Durst's Tate Britain Archive papers that when Durst returned to his studies after the 1914-1918 war he was very much drawn to the concept of "Direct Carving" as advocated by Jacob Epstein and Eric Gill. He also states that he was an admirer of Henri Gaudier-Brzeska the French sculptor killed in action in 1915.

George Pace, an English architect who worked with Dunst wrote of his philosophical approach towards sculpting:  
In 1964 when he had finished carving seven statues for the upper part of Peterborough Cathedral he told me that in his early days when he wanted to learn “direct carving” he found that the art schools of the day could only teach him modelling; for it was still the fashion for sculptors to make models which were then translated into stone or marble by technicians using pointers and masons' skills. After World War 1 the more realistic approach to sculpture enabled him to learn the techniques of direct carving and this equipped him to devote the rest of his life to spirited direct carving in stone, wood and ivory. From the summer of 1914 his life ambition was to complete a series of statues carved in the spirit he had extracted from Chartres.

He was appointed a member of The British School at Rome in 1945 - Faculty of Sculpture.

Gallery

See also
Holy Cross Church, Woodchurch

Notes

References

External links
Biography on the Tate Gallery website
from this comprehensive family tree of the reverend William Gibson we learn that Durst carved the tombstones of his sister Margaret Rosa Durst (buried at Whitchurch) and brother William Herbert Durst buried at Magdalen Hill Cemetery in Winchester.
A photograph of Alan Durst working on one of his pieces for Peterborough Cathedral
Website for Holy Trinity Church in Northwood
 Profile on Royal Academy of Arts Collections

1883 births
1970 deaths
Military personnel from Hampshire
Modern sculptors
English sculptors
English male sculptors
British architectural sculptors
20th-century British sculptors
Associates of the Royal Academy
Royal Marines personnel of World War I
Royal Marines personnel of World War II
Royal Marines officers